The 2005–06 season of the División de Honor de Futsal is the 17th season of top-tier futsal in Spain.

Regular season

League table

Playoffs

Championship playoffs

The Finals were broadcast in Spain on RTVE.

Championship playoffs matches

Quarter-finals
(8) MRA Gvtarra Navarra vs. (1) ElPozo Murcia Turística:
Game 1 @ Pamplona: MRA Gvtarra Navarra 10-11 ElPozo Murcia Turística
Game 2 @ Murcia: ElPozo Murcia Turística 10-3 MRA Gvtarra Navarra
ElPozo Murcia Turística wins the series 2-0
Total Aggregate: 13-21

(7) PSG Móstoles vs. (2) Interviú Boomerang:
Game 1 @ Móstoles: PSG Móstoles 5-6 Boomerang Interviú
Game 2 @ Alcalá de Henares: Boomerang Interviú 5-1 PSG Móstoles
Boomerang Interviú wins the series 2-0
Total Aggregate: 6-11

(6) Playas de Castellón vs. (3) Polaris World Cartagena:
Game 1 @ Castellón de la Plana: Playas de Castellón 2-4 Polaris World Cartagena
Game 2 @ Cartagena: Polaris World Cartagena 7-2 Playas de Castellón
Polaris World Cartagena wins the series 2-0
Total Aggregate: 4-11

(5) A. Lobelle de Santiago vs. (4) Martorell:
Game 1 @ Santiago de Compostela: Autos Lobelle de Santiago 4-3 Martorell
Game 2 @ Martorell: Martorell 6-3 Autos Lobelle de Santiago
Game 3 @ Martorell: Martorell 3-1 Autos Lobelle de Santiago
Martorell wins the series 2-1
Total Aggregate: 8-12

Semifinals

(1) ElPozo Murcia Turística vs. (4) Martorell:
Game 1 @ Murcia: ElPozo Murcia Turística 5-3 Martorell
Game 2 @ Murcia: ElPozo Murcia Turística 6-5 Martorell
Game 3 @ Martorell: Martorell 4-7 ElPozo Murcia Turística
ElPozo Murcia Turística wins the series 3-0 and qualifies to Finals
Total Aggregate: 18-12

(2) Interviú Boomerang vs. (3) Polaris World Cartagena:
Game 1 @ Alcalá de Henares: Boomerang Interviú 7-4 Polaris World Cartagena
Game 2 @ Alcalá de Henares: Boomerang Interviú 4-6 Polaris World Cartagena
Game 3 @ Cartagena: Polaris World Cartagena 8-3 Boomerang Interviú
Game 4 @ Cartagena: Polaris World Cartagena 3-1 Boomerang Interviú
Polaris World Cartagena wins the series 3-1 and qualifies to Finals
Total Aggregate: 15-21

Final
(1) ElPozo Murcia Turística vs. (3) Polaris World Cartagena:
Game 1 @ Murcia: June 10 ElPozo Murcia Turística 3-7 Polaris World Cartagena
Game 2 @ Murcia: June 11 ElPozo Murcia Turística FS 5-2 Polaris World Cartagena
Game 3 @ Cartagena: June 17 Polaris World Cartagena 2-3 ElPozo Murcia Turística FS
Game 4 @ Cartagena: June 18 Polaris World Cartagena 3-2 ElPozo Murcia Turística
Game 5 @ Murcia: June 24 ElPozo Murcia Turística 4-2 Polaris World Cartagena
ElPozo Murcia Turística wins the Final 3-2
Total Aggregate: 17-16
CHAMPION: : ElPozo Murcia Turística

Relegation playoff

 Benicarló Grupo Poblet remained in División de Honor.

External links
2005–06 season at lnfs.es

See also
División de Honor de Futsal
Futsal in Spain

2005 06
Spain
futsal
2005–06 in Spanish futsal